Infelici e contenti is a 1992 Italian comedy film directed by Neri Parenti.

Plot 
Aldo and Vittorio are two men with disabilities. One is blind, the other is reliant on a wheelchair. Vittorio one day by chance meets Aldo in the hospice and invites him to brake a pleasure trip to Sanremo in Liguria. In fact Vittorio, though blind, is a cheat who's in trouble, and he needs to go to Sanremo to settle a business. But in his messes, Vittorio also involves the gentle and naive Aldo...

Cast 

Renato Pozzetto: Aldo
Ezio Greggio: Vittorio
Marina Suma: Alessandra
Roberto Bisacco: Petrilli
Francesca D'Aloja: Ornella
Yvonne Sciò: Sara

References

External links

Infelici e contenti at Variety Distribution

1992 films
1992 comedy films
Italian comedy films
Films directed by Neri Parenti
Films scored by Bruno Zambrini
Films about blind people
Films about paraplegics or quadriplegics
1990s Italian films